David Whiteside (February 6, 1870 – March 8, 1947) was a Canadian politician. He served in the Legislative Assembly of British Columbia from 1917 to 1924, as a Liberal member for the constituency of New Westminster.

Born in the Toronto suburb of Scarborough Township, Ontario, he was a lawyer and judge, educated at Osgoode Hall Law School and first called to the Ontario Bar in 1895. Moving to British Columbia in 1899, he first settled in Rossland, British Columbia, then Phoenix, British Columbia. He practiced law with James Alexander MacDonald under the firm Macdonald & Whiteside in Grand Forks, British Columbia from 1902 to 1909. He practiced under the firm Whiteside, Edmonds & Whiteside in New Westminster starting in 1912 until 1925, when he entered the practice of McQuarrie, Whiteside & Duncan. In 1938, he was appointed as a judge on the County Court Bench. He died in Coquitlam in 1947.

References

1870 births
1947 deaths
British Columbia Liberal Party MLAs
People from Scarborough, Toronto
Politicians from Toronto